West York Area High School is a high school located in York, York County in south central Pennsylvania. According to the National Center for Education Statistics, the school reported an enrollment of 871 students in grades 9 through 12 in the 2018–2019 school year.

Part of the West York Area School District, the school serves children in grades nine through twelve. It operates on a two-semester, six term year with block scheduling of four-period days, each period lasting 80 minutes. Students may attend the local technical school or specialized center on a part-time basis. Career internships and diversified occupations programs are also available for seniors.

Campus

In 2009, the West York Area School Board began the process of upgrading the facilities at the school, beginning with the opening of a new gym in October 2014.  The development was completed in 2016 when a new two-story wing was added that includes eight additional classrooms and a large group instruction/meeting room. The existing science labs were renovated and three new labs were added. A new choral room was provided, along with a new guidance suite and the school auditorium was equipped with upgraded stage rigging, lights and sound systems.

Extracurricular activities
West York Area High School students have access to a wide variety of clubs, activities, and an extensive sports program.

Sport teams
The school uses navy blue and white as spirit colors, and its mascot is a Bulldog. The school is a member of PIAA AAA athletics class. In 2008, the school's football team won their Division with a 9-1 regular season record. They went on to become the first team from YAIAA to win an AA or AAA district championship, when they won the District III Championship in Hershey.  The Bulldogs' 2008 season came to an end, though, on December 5 at Altoona's Mansion Park Stadium, where the Bulldogs fell 49–21 to defending state champions, Thomas Jefferson High School. West York's final record was 13–2, the best in school history.

Boys
Baseball
Basketball
Cross Country
Football
Golf
Lacrosse
Soccer
Swimming and Diving
Tennis
Track and Field
Volleyball
Wrestling

Girls
Basketball
Cross Country
Field Hockey
Golf
Lacrosse
Soccer (Fall)
Softball
Swimming and Diving
Tennis
Track and Field
Volleyball

Music

The school produces a musical each year; recent productions have included Crazy for You in 2012, Brigadoon in 2011 and Thoroughly Modern Millie in 2010.

The school's marching band has been directed by Rod Meckley since 2012. The band show each year is themed; recent themes have included the music of  Ray Charles in 2012-13 and Elvis Presley]] in 2011–12. Previous themes have included American Tapestry, Island Pulse and the songs of Billy Joel.

The school also maintains a Jazz Ensemble (also directed by Rod Meckley).  This group performs a few times a year at the high school as well as at the York County: Distinguished Young Women competition.

References

External links
 
 School District website 

High schools in Central Pennsylvania
Schools in York County, Pennsylvania
Public high schools in Pennsylvania